The Crap Masegn is a mountain of the Glarus Alps, located near Flims in the canton of Graubünden, Switzerland. It lies south of the Vorab.

Territorially it divides on the municipal areas of Falera on its eastern face, a narrow southern stripe of Ladir and Ruschein on its western face.

There is a station of an aerial cableway of the same name which is nowhere near this peak but one kilometer southeast, on the nameless junction of the two ridges of Crest Da Tiarms and Crest La Siala. There is a chairlift and a gondola lift ending there as well, all of them belonging to the skiing resort of Flims-Laax-Falera which uses the name of Laax only for winter marketing.

See also
List of mountains of Switzerland accessible by public transport

References

External links
 Crap Masegn on Hikr

Mountains of the Alps
Mountains of Switzerland
Mountains of Graubünden